The men's team was one of two gymnastics events on the Gymnastics at the 1908 Summer Olympics programme.

Competition format

Each team was composed of between 16 and 40 gymnasts, with a time limit of 30 minutes for the performance.  Free gymnastics and hand apparati were allowed. There were three judges for each performance, each giving a score of up to 160 divided as follows: 40 points for "appearance and march of the competitors," 60 points for "precision of movement, style, etc.," and 60 points for "physiological and rational combination of the exercises executed." The judges' scores were summed. A total of 480 points was possible.

Results

Team rosters

Sweden

Norway

Finland

Denmark

France

Italy

Netherlands

Great Britain

References

Sources
 
 

Men's team